Lucien Fridolin Owona-Ndong (born 9 August 1990) is a Cameroonian professional footballer who plays as a central defender for Spanish club UE Cornellà.

Club career
Owona was born in Douala, and made his senior debut with AS Matelots in 2005. After spells at AS Cetef de Bonabéri and Les Astres FC, he agreed to a contract with Paris Saint-Germain on 10 September 2009.

After only appearing for PSG's B-team in Championnat de France amateur, Owona moved to Spain and joined Real Oviedo Vetusta on 31 January 2011. Although he did not play with the side due to bureaucratic problems, he was still promoted to the first team in Segunda División B on 28 May.

After leaving Oviedo, Owona continued to appear in the third level but also in Tercera División in the following years, representing SD Noja, Arroyo CP, CF Villanovense (two stints) and Caudal Deportivo. In 2015, while representing Villanovense, he suffered racial abuse from the supporters of Real Betis B.

On 17 January 2017, Owona signed a two-and-a-half-year contract with Segunda División side AD Alcorcón. He made his professional debut the following day, starting in a 0–2 Copa del Rey home loss against Deportivo Alavés.

Owona scored his first professional goal on 19 February 2017, netting the first in a 1–1 home draw against Real Zaragoza. On 22 July he terminated his contract, and signed a three-year deal with fellow second-tier club UD Almería just hours later.

On 22 January 2020, after suffering a serious injury, Owona cut ties with the Rojiblancos. On 23 September, after nine months without a club, he signed for Extremadura UD in the third tier.

International career
After representing Cameroon at under-20 level, Owona was included in Hugo Broos's final 23-man squad for the 2017 FIFA Confederations Cup.

After failing to appear during the whole tournament, Owona made his full international debut on 13 June 2017, starting in a 0–4 friendly loss against Colombia.

References

External links

1990 births
Living people
Footballers from Douala
Cameroonian footballers
Association football defenders
Les Astres players
Championnat National 2 players
Paris Saint-Germain F.C. players
Segunda División players
Segunda División B players
Tercera División players
Real Oviedo Vetusta players
Real Oviedo players
Arroyo CP players
CF Villanovense players
Caudal Deportivo footballers
AD Alcorcón footballers
UD Almería players
Extremadura UD footballers
UE Cornellà players
Cameroonian expatriate footballers
Cameroonian expatriate sportspeople in France
Cameroonian expatriate sportspeople in Spain
Expatriate footballers in France
Expatriate footballers in Spain
Cameroon youth international footballers
Cameroon international footballers
2017 FIFA Confederations Cup players